Philippe Gosselin (born 23 October 1966) is a French lawyer and politician of the Republicans (LR) who has been serving as a member of the National Assembly of France since the 2007 elections, representing the Manche department.

Political career
In parliament, Gosselin serves on the Committee on Legal Affairs. In addition to his committee assignments, he is a member of the French-South African Parliamentary Friendship Group and the French-Spanish Parliamentary Friendship Group.

Following Christian Jacob's election as LR chairman, Gosselin announced her candidacy to succeed him as leader of the party's parliamentary group. In an internal vote in November 2019, he eventually came in last out of six candidates; the position went to Damien Abad instead.

Political positions
In the Republicans’ 2016 presidential primaries, Gosselin endorsed Hervé Mariton as the party's candidate for the office of President of France. In the party's 2017 leadership election, he later supported Laurent Wauquiez.

In July 2019, Gosselin voted against the French ratification of the European Union’s Comprehensive Economic and Trade Agreement (CETA) with Canada.

In 2021, Gosselin opposed a bill to modify the first article of the constitution and add that France “guarantees the preservation of the environment and of biological diversity, and fights against climate change.”

References

External links

 Official web site

1966 births
Living people
People from Carentan
Politicians from Normandy
Union for a Popular Movement politicians
The Republicans (France) politicians
Sciences Po alumni
Deputies of the 13th National Assembly of the French Fifth Republic
Deputies of the 14th National Assembly of the French Fifth Republic
Deputies of the 15th National Assembly of the French Fifth Republic
Deputies of the 16th National Assembly of the French Fifth Republic
Members of Parliament for Manche